Philip Henry Dugro (October 3, 1855 – March 1, 1920) was an American lawyer, judge, and U.S. Representative from New York, serving from 1881 to 1883.

Biography
Born in New York City, Dugro attended the public schools and was graduated from the school of arts of Columbia College, New York City, in 1876 and from the law department of the same institution in 1878.
He was admitted to the bar in the latter year and commenced practice in New York City.

State legislature 
He was a member of the New York State Assembly (New York Co., 14th D.) in 1879.

Congress 
Dugro was elected as a Democrat to the Forty-seventh Congress (March 4, 1881 – March 3, 1883).
He was not a candidate for reelection.

Later career and death 
He resumed the practice of law in New York City and also interested in the real-estate business.
He declined the office of State commissioner of immigration in 1885. He served as judge of the superior court of New York County from 1887 to 1896, when the superior court was merged into the supreme court.

He served as associate justice of the New York Supreme Court from 1896 until his death in New York City March 1, 1920.

He was interred in Woodlawn Cemetery.

References

External links 
 

1855 births
1920 deaths
Columbia Law School alumni
Democratic Party members of the United States House of Representatives from New York (state)
New York Supreme Court Justices